Californication may refer to:
Californication (word), an expression that refers to the influx of Californians into various western states in the U.S.
Californication (album), a 1999 album by the Red Hot Chili Peppers
"Californication" (song), the title track and a single from the album
Californication tour, worldwide concert tour following the album release
Californication (TV series), an American television series

See also
"Californicatin", a song on You're Gettin' Even While I'm Gettin' Odd (1984), the last album by The J. Geils Band